Fatah al-Intifada ( Fatah Uprising) is a Palestinian militant faction founded by Col. Said al-Muragha, better known as Abu Musa. The group is often referred to as the Abu Musa Faction. Officially it refers to itself as the Palestinian National Liberation Movement - "Fatah", the identical name of the major Fatah movement. Fatah al-Intifada is not part of the Palestine Liberation Organization (PLO).

History

Rupture with PLO
Originally part of Fatah, Fatah al-Intifada broke away from the organization in 1983, during the PLO's participation in the Lebanese Civil War. The split was due to differences between Abu Musa and Yasser Arafat over a number of issues, including military decisions and corruption. Fatah al-Intifada was formed with Syrian support and quickly attracted a number of Palestinian guerrillas disillusioned with Arafat's role in Fatah and the Palestine Liberation Organization (PLO). There was also a political dimension: the organization took a more leftist view than the generally apolitical Fatah, and used socialist rhetoric. Abu Musa is known to have advocated the view that the Lebanese Civil War was not a sectarian conflict, but a form of class war. Syria provided extensive backing as the Abu Musa forces attacked Arafat loyalists in Fatah, while several radical PLO organizations in the Rejectionist Front stayed on the sidelines. The fighting led to heavy losses on both sides, and helped Syria extend its influence into Palestinian-held areas of Lebanon.

War of the camps 
In 1985-88, Fatah al-Intifada took part in the War of the camps, a Syrian attempt to root out the PLO from its refugee camp strongholds backed by the Shiite Amal militia and some Palestinian rejectionist factions. After a joint effort by the Syrian Army and a number of Palestinian and Lebanese groups controlled or supported by Damascus, including Fatah al-Intifada, the PFLP-GC, as-Sa'iqa, Amal, the Syrian PLA and parts of the PLF, the PLO was gradually expelled from Lebanon in the mid-to late 1980s. By that time Fatah al-Intifada had been reduced to a minor part of Syria's network of militia proxies, with little or no independent decision-making.

Decline
By the late 1980s, Fatah al-Intifada had a brief rapprochement with Arafat's Fatah, but due to its opposition to the Oslo Accords, and generally poor relations between the PLO and the Assad government, Fatah al-Intifada has not been able to secure a role in today's Palestinian politics. Instead it remains a minor faction in the Palestinian refugee camps of Syria and Lebanon, where it was able to organize under the umbrella of the Syrian military presence until its end in 2005. It remains very much a part of Syrian-sponsored efforts to influence Palestinian politics, regularly backing Syrian initiatives and being a core member of a Syrian-led coalition of Palestinian groups based in Damascus. In the Syrian Civil War, Fatah al-Intifada fought alongside the government against the Syrian opposition, and took part in the Siege of Eastern Ghouta, the Southern Damascus offensive (April–May 2018), and other battles. By 2018, however, it began to lay off its fighters due to the decreasing intensity of the civil war and lack of funds.

Leadership 
Abu Musa was the leader of the group until his death in 2013. The post of Secretary-General is now held by Abu Hazim, while Abu Fadi Hammad acts as Regional Secretary-General for Lebanon.

Militant activities 
During the 1980s, Fatah al-Intifada committed a number of attacks on Israel, including on Israeli civilians, but it has not been involved in violence against Israel since sometime before the Oslo Accords in 1993.

See also 
 List of armed groups in the Syrian Civil War

References

External links
Center for Palestinian Media Studies - Fatah al-Intifada  Official Fatah al-Intifada website
Former factions of the Palestine Liberation Organization
Palestinian militant groups
Palestinian nationalist parties
Pro-government factions of the Syrian civil war
Socialist parties in the Palestinian territories
Military units and formations established in 1983
Axis of Resistance